Yegor Olegovich Ivanov (born 19 June 1992) is a Russian football player who plays as a centre midfielder for FC Yenisey Krasnoyarsk.

Club career
In June 2013 Ivanov joined Yenisey Krasnoyarsk on a season long loan from CSKA Moscow. He made his debut in the Russian Football National League for FC Yenisey Krasnoyarsk on 7 July 2013 in a game against FC Rotor Volgograd.

References

External links
 
 

1992 births
Sportspeople from Omsk
Living people
Russian footballers
Russia youth international footballers
Association football midfielders
FC Yenisey Krasnoyarsk players
PFC CSKA Moscow players
Russian First League players